The 1954 Singapore Open, also known as the 1954 Singapore Badminton Championships, took place from 20 October 1954 – 16 January 1955 at the Singapore Badminton Hall in Singapore. The ties were played over a few months with the first round ties being played on the 20th of October and the finals were played on the 15th and 16 January 1955 due to some postponement.

Venue
Singapore Badminton Hall

Final results

References 

Singapore Open (badminton)
1954 in badminton